Rosa Keleku (born 16 January 1995) is a Democratic Republic of the Congo taekwondo athlete.

At the 2015 African Games she won a silver medal in the 49 kg category. She qualified for the 2016 Summer Olympics and she carried her country's flag in the opening ceremony in Rio de Janeiro. She was the only one of her country's team to qualify. The other members of her country's team were chosen under a principle of universality. She competed in the women's 49 kg, where she lost to Itzel Manjarrez in the preliminaries.

References

External links
 

1995 births
Living people
Sportspeople from Kinshasa
Democratic Republic of the Congo female taekwondo practitioners
Olympic taekwondo practitioners of the Democratic Republic of the Congo
Taekwondo practitioners at the 2016 Summer Olympics
African Games silver medalists for DR Congo
African Games medalists in taekwondo
Competitors at the 2015 African Games